The Labor News was a weekly English-language broadsheet newspaper published in Sydney, Australia. It was later absorbed by the Labor Daily newspaper.

History
First published in 1918 on behalf of the N.S.W. branch of the Australian Labor Party by the Worker Trustees, The Labor News commenced publication on 12 October 1918, with issue No. 1 of Volume 1, and continued to be published under that title until 26 January 1924.

The last issue of the paper appeared on 26 January 1924, and contained on page 7 a notice proclaiming "The Labor Daily arrives – The Labor News passes", which also stated that the paper "...willingly ... joins up with its big successor ... and whole-heartedly throws its weight into the effort that is going to make our Daily Sydney's leading newspaper".

Digitisation
Many issues of the paper have been digitised as part of the Australian Newspapers Digitisation Program a project of the National Library of Australia in cooperation with the State Library of New South Wales.

See also
 List of newspapers in Australia
 List of newspapers in New South Wales

References

External links
 

Newspaper companies of Australia
Defunct newspapers published in Sydney
Publications established in 1918
1918 establishments in Australia
1924 disestablishments in Australia
Publications disestablished in 1924